A brass ring is a small grabbable ring that a dispenser presents to a carousel rider during the course of a ride. Usually there are a large number of iron rings and one brass one, or just a few. It takes some dexterity to grab a ring from the dispenser as the carousel rotates. The iron rings can be tossed at a target as an amusement. Typically, getting the brass ring gets the rider some sort of prize when presented to the operator. The prize often is a free repeat ride.

The figurative phrase to grab the brass ring is derived from this device.

Background

Brass ring devices were developed during the heyday of the carousel in the U.S.—about 1880 to 1921. At one time, the riders on the outside row of horses were often given a little challenge, perhaps as a way to draw interest or build excitement, more often as an enticement to sit on the outside row of horses which frequently did not move up and down and were therefore less enticing by themselves. Most rings were iron, but one or two per ride were made of brass; if a rider managed to grab a brass ring, it could be redeemed for a free ride.
References to a literal brass ring go back into the 1890s.

As the carousel began to turn, rings were fed to one end of a wooden arm that was suspended above the riders.  Riders hoped that the timing of the carousel rotation (and the rise-and-fall motion of their seat, when movable seats were included in the outer circle of the carousel) would place them within reach of the dispenser when a ring (and preferably a brass ring) was available.

Another system had mostly steel rings of no value and one brass ring, and a target into which the rings were to be thrown (for example the Santa Cruz Beach Boardwalk Looff Carousel uses a clown target shown in the photo above, and the Knoebel's Amusement Resort Grand Carousel uses a lion target), discouraging retention of the rings as souvenirs.

Cultural references
"Grabbing the brass ring" or getting a "shot at the brass ring" also means striving for the highest prize, or living life to the fullest. It is not clear when the phrase came into wide use but has been found in dictionaries as far back as the late 19th century.

The term has been used as the title of at least two books.

 The final scene of The Catcher in the Rye features a carousel with a brass ring, which Holden Caulfield's sister Phoebe reaches for. The brass ring is symbolic of adulthood, the transition to which is a preoccupation of Holden throughout the book.
 The Four Seasons song "Beggin'" references "now that big brass ring is a shade of black", in reference to having missed an important opportunity.
Dispatch song “Flying Horses” references stealing a ring from The Flying Horses Merry Go Round located in Martha’s Vineyard Massachusetts.
 The Barenaked Ladies song "Get Back Up" references "getting fitted for a new brass ring", in reference to continuing to strive for success.
 "Brass Rings And Daydreams" is a song written by Richard M. Sherman and Robert B. Sherman for the 1978 motion picture musical The Magic of Lassie and performed by Debby Boone.
 In professional wrestling, Tyson Kidd and Cesaro formed an alliance and called themselves "The Brass Ring Club" in 2015.
 At the climax of the film Sneakers, all of the main characters have the opportunity to receive anything they want in exchange for handing over a crucial piece of technology to the NSA. When River Phoenix's character requests something with no monetary value, he is admonished by Robert Redford's character to think bigger, as "this is the brass ring."
 In the big blowup argument in the film Fools Rush In, the main character, Alex Whitman, says, "Look, this is the brass ring. I've worked my entire life for this kind of opportunity and I am not gonna throw it all away just because one night I put a five-dollar ring on your finger in front of Elvis as a witness!"
 The International Association of Amusement Parks and Attractions (IAAPA) presents "Brass Ring Awards" annually, to recognize achievement in the global attractions industry and to "honor excellence in food and beverage, games and retail, human resources, live entertainment, marketing, new products, and exhibits."
 The Grateful Dead song "Crazy Fingers" includes the lyrics "Midnight on a carousel ride / Reaching for the gold ring down inside," in which the brass ring is called a "gold ring" by means of poetic license.
The American Music Club song "If I Had a Hammer" (from the Mercury album) includes the lyrics "The love cry of the traveling man goes / "No one knows who I am, / but I'm as priceless as a brass ring / that's losing the heat from your hand."..."

Brass ring carousels today
Although there are many carousels extant, only a handful of carousels still have brass rings. The following pre-1960 vintage carousels in North America have operating brass ring dispensers/targets:

Rings removed
The following carousels are no longer running rings:

References

External links
Knoebels Carousel:
From Poremsky.net
From Amusement-parks.com
Flying Horses: from cape cod online

Carousels
Metaphors referring to objects
Rings (jewellery)
Metal rings